The Museum at Prairiefire is a museum in Overland Park, Kansas.  The museum is a 42,000 square foot facility that opened in May 2014 and has received honors for its architecture style.  The museum carries displays created by  other museums, such as American Museum of Natural History.  Prairiefire secured a partnership with the American Museum of Natural History and displays two main traveling exhibits annually.

References

External links
 Museum at Prairiefire - official home page

Museums in Johnson County, Kansas
Buildings and structures in Overland Park, Kansas
Natural history museums in Kansas